Diplocalyptis ferruginimixta is a moth of the family Tortricidae which is endemic to Vietnam.

The ground colour of the forewings is pale brownish grey, but more creamish in the costal and terminal areas and brownish the in dorsal third of the wing. The strigulation is brownish grey. The hindwings are brownish grey, but cream towards the base, with brownish venation.

Etymology
The specific name refers to ferruginous colouration of the median fascia and is derived from Latin mixta (meaning mixed).

References

Archipini
Moths of Asia
Endemic fauna of Vietnam
Moths described in 2009
Taxa named by Józef Razowski